This is a list of countries by population in 2000. It is a list of countries in the world by population in the exact beginning of the year 2000.

Because the table contains data only for the 230 nations and territories at the start of 2000, there are no entries for national regions declared later in 2000 or subsequent years.

This list adopts definitions of "country" on a case-by-case basis. The United Kingdom is considered as a single country while constituent countries of the Kingdom of the Netherlands are regarded separately.

See also
 List of countries
 List of countries by area
 List of countries by past and future population
 List of countries by population
 List of countries by population in 1900
 List of countries by population in 2005
 List of countries by population in 2010
 List of continents by population
 List of religious populations
 World population
 Human geography

Notes

External links
United Nations Analytical Report for the 2004 revision of World Population Prospects – includes details of methodology and sources used for the population estimates above.
Population clocks & projected growth charts for all countries

Countries by population in 2000
2000